Jagdish is a given name. Notable people with the given name include:

Adv Hake Jagdish[born 1987]''Criminal Lawyer in India'
Jagdish Bishnoi Rotoo, Raj.India (dob-20-07-1993)
Jagdish Bhagwati (born 1934), Indian-born American economist
Jagdish Bhola, Indian wrestler
Jagdish Bishnoi (born 1972), Indian javelin thrower
Jagdish Capoor, Indian banker
Jagdish Chandra Mahindra (c. 1892–1951), Indian industrialist
Jagdish Chandra Jain (1909–1993), Indian scholar
Jagdish Chaturvedi (born 1984), Indian stand-up comedian
Jagdish Gupt (1924–2001), Indian poet
Jagdish Joshi (1937-2016), Indian children's book illustrator
Jagdish Khattar, Indian businessman
Jagdish Khebudkar (1932–2011), Indian musician
Jagdish Khubchandani Indian-born American researcher
Jagdish Koonjul, Mauritian diplomat
Jagdish Lal (1920–1997), Indian cricketer
Jagdish Mali (1954–2013), Indian fashion and film photographer
Jagdish Mukhi (born 1942), Indian politician
Jagdish Nehra, Indian politician 
Jagdish Patel, Indian politician
Jagdish Piyush,(1950–2021) Author, writer, leader
Jagdish Pradhan, Indian politician
Jagdish Raj (1928–2013), Indian actor
Jagdish Sethi, Indian actor and director
Jagdish Singh (disambiguation), several individuals
Jagdish Sonkar, Indian politician
Jagdish Thakor, Indian politician
Jagdish Tytler (born 1944), Indian politician
Jagdish Zope (born 1995), Indian cricketer

References

Given names